The Rhein-Flugzeugbau RF-1 was a prototype channel wing aircraft.

Design and development
The RF-1 is a modification of the channel wing concept, that uses a single channel and propeller to eliminate the asymmetrical lift issues with a twin channel wing design. The "channel" is an airfoil-shaped section along the lower arc of the rearward propeller that produces additional lift from the propwash. The RF-1's propeller was completely shrouded, creating a hybrid ducted propeller. Twin engine redundancy is maintained with multiple engines driving a central propeller with freewheeling clutches to allow for an engine failure.

The aircraft had the unique shape to facilitate a channel wing design. The fuselage was composed of welded steel tubing with a composite skin. The landing gear was electrically retractable.

Operational history
The prototype was built at Krefeld/Mönchengladbach and was only flown once.

Variants
RF-1 V1
The original prototype
RF-1 V2
A modified prototype that did not go into production. Changes included  engines.

Specifications (Rhein-Flugzeugbau RF-1)

See also

References

1960s German civil utility aircraft
RF-001
Twin-engined single-prop pusher aircraft
Ducted fan-powered aircraft
Mid-engined aircraft
Channel-wing aircraft
Aircraft first flown in 1960
High-wing aircraft